Mirbağır İsayev (born 13 March 1974) is a retired Azerbaijani footballer.

References

1974 births
Living people
Footballers from Baku
Azerbaijani footballers
Azerbaijani football managers
Azerbaijan Premier League players
Qarabağ FK players
Association football midfielders
Azerbaijan international footballers
Neftçi PFK players